Manchester Castle was a medieval fortified manor house, probably located on a bluff where the rivers Irk and Irwell meet, near to Manchester Cathedral, where Chetham's School of Music now is, putting it near the edge of the medieval township of Manchester.

History

Manchester Castle was first referred to in 1184; in 1215 it was recorded as belonging to the Greslé family, who were barons of Manchester. This is the last historic reference to the castle. Before the manor house was built, Manchester Castle may have taken the form of a ringwork constructed from timber and with a wooden palisade. This earlier castle has been described as "of no political or military importance". Three rings of ditches have been discovered surrounding the likely site of the castle, however these may be part of a Saxon burh or Norman castle.

In his book Warfare in England (1912), author and historian Hilaire Belloc identified the "Manchester Gap", between the Pennines and the Mersey estuary, to be one of the two most important defensive lines in medieval England along with the line of the River Thames. Although Belloc ascribed great importance to Manchester and its notional ability to hamper troop movements, castle historian D.J. Cathcart King refuted Belloc as the site was forgotten at an early date.

See also
Castles in Greater Manchester
History of Manchester

References
Notes

Bibliography

Buildings and structures in Manchester
History of Manchester
Ringwork castles